Gamma Arietis (γ Arietis, abbreviated Gamma Ari, γ Ari) is a binary star (possibly trinary) in the northern constellation of Aries. The two components are designated γ1 Arietis or Gamma Arietis B and γ2 Arietis or Gamma Arietis A (formally named Mesarthim , the traditional name for the Gamma Arietis system).  γ1 Arietis may itself be a spectroscopic binary with a low mass companion.

The combined apparent visual magnitude of the stars is 3.86, which is readily visible to the naked eye and makes this the fourth-brightest member of Aries.

Properties
The double star nature of this system was discovered by Robert Hooke in 1664. The two components have an angular separation of 7.606 arcseconds, which can be resolved with a small telescope. The orbital period of the pair is greater than 5000 years.

The brighter component, γ2 Arietis, is an α2 CVn type variable star, a type of star with a strong magnetic field and enhanced spectral lines of some metals, with high chromospheric activity causing brightness changes as the star rotates.  Its brightness varies by 0.04 magnitudes with a period of 2.61 days.  It is also an Ap star, a type of chemically peculiar star with enhanced lines of many metals.  The spectral class has been given as A2IVpSiSrCr, noting the particular strength of lines of silicon, strontium, and chromium, although other lines such as europium, mercury, and manganese are also stronger than a normal star.  This spectral type suggests that the star is an A2-class subgiant.  One study identified a low-mass companion to γ2 Arietis, a probable red dwarf in a close orbit.

The marginally fainter of the two visible stars, γ1 Arietis, is a Lambda Boötis (chemically peculiar) star with a stellar classification of A0Vnp and a magnitude of 4.64. Lambda Boötis stars are identified based on unusually low abundances of iron peak elements in their spectra.  The spectral class has also been given as A0IV-V(n)kB8, indicating that calcium K lines in its spectrum are more typical of a B8 star.  Older studies often classified it as B9 or B9.5 with a luminosity class of IV or V, indicating either a main sequence or subgiant.

Their age is about 34 million years.

Nomenclature

γ Arietis (Latinised to Gamma Arietis) is the system's Bayer designation; γ1 and γ2 Arietis those of its two components. The designation of the two components as Gamma Arietis A and B derive from the convention used by the Washington Multiplicity Catalog (WMC) for multiple star systems, and adopted by the International Astronomical Union (IAU).

Gamma Arietis has been called "the First Star in Aries" as having been at one time the nearest visible star to the equinoctial point.

It bore the traditional name Mesarthim. Originally it had shared the name Sheratan with Beta Arietis. However, this got corrupted to "Sartai" in medieval manuscripts, which Bayer erroneously explained as being the Hebrew grammatical term   "servants", and later scholars picked up on this term.

In 2016, the IAU organized a Working Group on Star Names (WGSN) to catalogue and standardize proper names for stars. The WGSN decided to attribute proper names to individual stars rather than entire multiple systems. It approved the name Mesarthim for the component γ2 Arietis on 21 August 2016 and it is now so entered in the IAU Catalog of Star Names.

In Hindu astrology, Gamma Arietis and Beta Arietis (Sheratan) are Ashvins, the twin Rigvedic deities who act as doctors of the divine of the world.(Richard H Allen)

References

External links
 HR 545
 HR 546
 The Constellations and Named Stars
 Image Gamma Arietis
 Image Gamma2 Arietis

011502
Binary stars
008832
Aries (constellation)
Arietis, Gamma
Alpha2 Canum Venaticorum variables
A-type main-sequence stars
Mesarthim
Arietis, 05
0545 6
A-type subgiants
Durchmusterung objects
Lambda Boötis stars